Dagong Europe Credit Rating is a subsidiary of Chinese state-owned credit rating agency Dagong Global Credit Rating. It was established in March 2012 with headquarters in Milan, Italy. In June 2013, it was registered and received authorization from the European Securities and Markets Authority ('ESMA') under the Article 16 of the Credit Rating Agency (CRA) regulation. It is the first entity to have applied for registration as a CRA with shareholders from the People's Republic of China. It is recognized by the Joint Committee of the three European Supervisory Authorities (EBA, ESMA and EIOPA – ESAs) as External Credit Assessment Institutions (ECAI) operating in the European Union. In December 2016, Dagong Europe opened its branch office in Frankfurt, Germany.

Dagong Europe is solely owned by its parent company, Dagong Global Credit Rating. The parent company stated that it has used "dialectical materialism" as part of its evaluative approach. In 2018, the parent company's operations were suspended following accusations of corruption and doctored ratings in exchange for fees. In 2019, the parent company was nationalized.

References

External links
 

Credit rating agencies
Financial services companies of Italy
Italian companies established in 2012
Companies based in Milan
Government-owned companies of China

zh:大公欧洲资信评估